America First refers to a policy stance in the United States that generally emphasizes nationalism and non-interventionism. The term was coined by president Woodrow Wilson in his 1916 campaign that pledged to keep America neutral in World War I. A more isolationist approach gained prominence in the interwar period (1918–1939), with the policy being employed by the Ku Klux Klan in the 1920s; it was also advocated by the America First Committee, a non-interventionist pressure group against U.S. entry into World War II.

Decades later, Donald Trump used the slogan in his 2016 presidential campaign and presidency (2017–2021), emphasizing the U.S.'s withdrawal from international treaties and organizations in the administration's foreign policy. Media critics have derided Trump's use of the America First policy as "America Alone".

History

Origins
"America First" has been used as a slogan by both Democratic and Republican politicians in the United States. At the outbreak of World War I, President Woodrow Wilson used the motto to define his version of neutrality as well as journalist William Randolph Hearst. The motto was also chosen by Republican Senator Warren G. Harding during the 1920 presidential election, which he won.

The Ku Klux Klan (KKK) used the phrase at the organization's peak in the 1920s, when racist, xenophobic sentiment was widespread; it informed many of their members who ran for political office. The Immigration Act of 1924 sponsored by Washington U.S. representative Albert Johnson proved to legislate xenophobia and white supremacy, excluding immigrants on the basis of ethnicity and national origin in an effort to preserve white racial demographics. Johnson's leading role in the immigration restriction bill elicited strong support from the KKK.

America First is best known as the slogan and foreign policy advocated by the America First Committee, a non-interventionist pressure group against the American entry into World War II, which emphasized American nationalism and unilateralism in international relations. The America First Committee's membership peaked at 800,000 paying members in 450 chapters, and it popularized the slogan "America First". While the America First Committee had a variety of supporters in the U.S., the movement was muddled with anti-Semitic and fascist rhetoric. Notable Americans who supported "America First" causes include Elizabeth Dilling, Gerald L. K. Smith, and Charles Lindbergh, while Dr. Seuss derided the policy in a number of political cartoons, linking it to Nazism.

In later periods, the slogan was used by Pat Buchanan, who praised the non-interventionist WWII America First Committee and said "the achievements of that organization are monumental." Buchanan's "call for an America First foreign policy has been compared with the America First Committee."

Donald Trump

Donald Trump, who had run against Pat Buchanan in the 2000 Reform Party presidential primaries, first revived the slogan in a November 2015  in The Wall Street Journal. In its early going, the Trump campaign publicized an article by Jeff Kuhner on the World Tribune praising the candidate as a "nationalist who seeks to put America first"; campaign manager Corey Lewandowski (who later published a book with the title) promoted Trump with the phrase; and both Sarah Palin and Chris Christie featured it in their endorsements of Trump. Trump later incorporated the slogan into his daily repertoire following a suggestion and historical comparison by David E. Sanger during an interview with The New York Times in March 2016. In subsequent months, without referencing Pat Buchanan's prior usage or the America First Committee, candidate Trump promised that "'America First' would be the major and overriding theme" of his administration, and advocated nationalist, anti-interventionist positions.

Following his election to the presidency, "America First" became the official foreign policy doctrine of the Trump administration. It was a theme of Trump's inaugural address, and a Politico/Morning Consult poll released on January 25, 2017, stated that 65% of Americans responded positively to President Trump's "America First" inaugural message, with 39% viewing the speech as poor. Trump embraced American unilateralism abroad and introduced policies aimed at undermining transnational organizations such as the European Union, and often critiquing them on economic terms. In 2017, the administration proposed a federal budget for 2018 with both Make America Great Again and America First in its title, with the latter referencing its increases to military, homeland security, and veteran spending, cuts to spending that goes towards foreign countries, and 10-year objective of achieving a balanced budget.

The administration branded its 2017 National Security Strategy of the U.S. as "an America First National Security Strategy". The introduction to that document reads "This National Security Strategy puts America first. An America First National Security Strategy is based on American principles, a clear-eyed assessment of U.S. interests, and a determination to tackle the challenges that we face. It is a strategy of principled realism that is guided by outcomes, not ideology."

Trump's use of the slogan was criticized by some for carrying comparisons to the America First Committee; however, Trump denied being an isolationist, and said, "I like the expression." A number of scholars (such as Deborah Dash Moore), commentators (such as Bill Kristol) and Jewish organizations (including the Anti-Defamation League and Jewish Council for Public Affairs) criticized Trump's use of the slogan because of its historical association with nativism and antisemitism. Others have argued that Trump was never a non-interventionist. Columnist Daniel Larison from The American Conservative wrote that "Trump was quick to denounce previous wars as disasters, but his complaint about these wars was that the U.S. wasn't 'getting' anything tangible from them. He didn't see anything wrong in attacking other countries, but lamented that the U.S. didn't 'take' their resources" and that "he never called for an end to the wars that were still ongoing, but talked only about 'winning' them."

Trump's "America First" policy has been described as a major factor in the perceived increase in the international isolation of the U.S. in the late 2010s, and various media critics such as The New Yorker have described the policy as "America Alone".

Other usage 
In mid-2016, while running for a Louisiana Senate seat, David Duke, former Grand Wizard of the KKK, publicly claimed that he was "the first major candidate in modern times to promote the term and policy of America first" (although was preceded by Donald Trump).

Trump's successor as U.S. president, Joe Biden, discontinued many of Trump's -related "America First" policies at the beginning of his presidency, however he initially kept the Trump administration's COVID-19 vaccine export ban in place. As of May 2021, the U.S. had started exporting vaccines out of its borders. The U.S. House Select Committee on the January 6 Attack described far-right political commentator Nick Fuentes and former Identity Evropa leader Patrick Casey as leaders of the "America First" movement in a subpoena issued in January 2022.

In popular culture
Following Trump's inauguration, the policy and its phrasing became a subject of international satire through the Every Second Counts video contest inspired by Dutch comedian Arjen Lubach and launched by German comedian Jan Böhmermann. News satire television programs initially throughout Europe, and later from around the world, comically appealed to Trump to acknowledge their own countries in light of Trump's nationalist slogan, with a narrator mimicking Trump's voice, speech patterns, and exaggerated speaking style. Lubach's initial version, for example, ended by noting that "We totally understand it's going to be America first, but can we just say: The Netherlands second?".

In Spike Lee's film BlacKkKlansman (2018), David Duke and white supremacists are portrayed as repeatedly using the "America First" slogan.

See also
 Make America Great Again
 Neo-nationalism
 Political messages of Dr. Seuss
 Trump tariffs
 Trump wall

References

American nationalism
American political catchphrases
Anti-war movement
Articles containing video clips
Isolationism
Non-interventionism
Opposition to World War II
Paleoconservatism
Right-wing populism in the United States
Policies of Donald Trump
Populism in the United States
Trumpism
United States foreign policy
Xenophobia